Hector Tubonemi (born 5 September 1988) is a Nigerian footballer who currently plays for Slovan Galanta.

Career
He started his football career with Christ the King FC of Port Harcourt and joined 2008 to Slovak club ŠK Blava Jaslovské Bohunice.

In 2019, Tubonemi joined FC Slovan Galanta.

References

External links
 
 Eurofotbal profile
 MFK Dubnica profile

1988 births
Living people
Nigerian footballers
Association football forwards
Footballers from Rivers State
FK Dubnica players
FK Železiarne Podbrezová players
FC ŠTK 1914 Šamorín players
MFK Zemplín Michalovce players
1. FC Tatran Prešov players
FK Slavoj Trebišov players
Slovak Super Liga players
Expatriate footballers in Slovakia